Ivan Radulov (born 7 January 1939, in Burgas) is a Bulgarian chess grandmaster.

As a chess player, he was most prominent during the 1970s, winning the Bulgarian Championship in 1971, 1974, 1977 and 1980. He just missed out at the 1976 event, finishing 2nd (with Peicho Peev, after Evgeny Ermenkov). It was during this decade that Radulov took over from Georgi Tringov as Bulgaria's leading player, eventually giving way to Kiril Georgiev in the 1980s.

International tournament victories came at Torremolinos 1971 (shared with Miguel Quinteros), Helsinki 1972, Montilla 1974 (ahead of a strong field including Lubomir Kavalek, Helmut Pfleger, Miguel Quinteros, Florin Gheorghiu and Ulf Andersson), Bajmok 1975 (shared with Milan Matulović and Milan Vukić), Montilla 1975 (shared with Lev Polugaevsky) and Kikinda 1976. Second places at Varna 1968, Debrecen 1968 and Silkeborg 1983 were also noteworthy achievements and his third place at Albena in 1975, contributed to a busy and successful year. In 2013 in Plovdiv he won the European Senior Rapid Championships.

He was a regular member of the Bulgarian Olympiad team, competing eight times between 1968 and 1986 and winning bronze team and individual medals at his first appearance.

International Master and International Grandmaster titles were awarded to Radulov in 1968 and 1972, respectively. He was for many years a practicing civil engineer and among other projects, contributed to the design of the central train station of Sofia.

Ivan Radulov has been married for more than 40 years to Eleonora and together they have two children and four grandchildren: Viktoria, Ivan, another Ivan, and Julian.

References

Olimpbase - Olympiads and other Team event information

External links
 
Ivan Radulov  player profile and games at chess-db.com
 

1939 births
Living people
Chess grandmasters
Bulgarian chess players
Chess Olympiad competitors
Sportspeople from Burgas